Clyde River is a national park in south-eastern New South Wales (Australia) between Batemans Bay and Nelligen.  It includes 9 km of river frontage to the Clyde River, bounded on three sides by the Clyde River and on the northeast by the Kings Highway.  It was created from a part of Benandarah State Forest; in 2000 10.91 km2 of the state forest was set aside as a national park.  The park forms part of the Ulladulla to Merimbula Important Bird Area, identified as such by BirdLife International because of its importance for swift parrots.

This national park is a natural playground, where you can go fishing, kayaking, canoeing, swimming and at the same time enjoy the beautiful landscape.

Primarily, this is the land of the Walbunja people, the Clyde River has been an inexhaustible source of food for them for thousands of years.

See also
 Protected areas of New South Wales

References 

National parks of New South Wales
South Coast (New South Wales)
Protected areas established in 2000
2000 establishments in Australia
Important Bird Areas of New South Wales
Eurobodalla Shire